The Forge of Vulcan or Vulcan's Forge is an oil on copper painting by Giorgio Vasari, executed c. 1564, now in the Uffizi in Florence. A 1565-1567 copy by Pier Candido is now in Windsor Castle as part of the Royal Collection.

Influenced by the Medici court under Cosimo I and Francesco I, its themes and composition are similar to panels from the studiolo of the Palazzo Vecchio. Like them it derives from a letter to Vasari by Vincenzo Borghini, in which the writer recommended he not just paint a forge but also "an Academy of certain virtues" led by Minerva. This was a cultured reference to the Accademia delle Arti del Disegno that Vasari had founded in 1563 under the protection of Cosimo I. From 1589 onwards and possibly earlier it was displayed in the Tribuna of the Uffizi.

References

Paintings in the collection of the Uffizi
1564 paintings
Paintings by Giorgio Vasari
Paintings of Minerva
Paintings of Vulcan (mythology)